The 2015–16 McNeese State Cowboys basketball team represented McNeese State University during the 2015–16 NCAA Division I men's basketball season. The Cowboys were led by tenth year head coach Dave Simmons and played their home games at Burton Coliseum. The Cowboys were members of the Southland Conference. They finished the season with a record of 8–21, 6–12 in Southland play to finish in eighth place. They lost to Nicholls State in the first round of the Southland tournament.

Preseason
The Cowboys were picked to finish tenth (10th) in both the Southland Conference Coaches' Poll and eighth (8th) in the Sports Information Directors Poll.

Roster

Schedule and results
Source

|-
!colspan=9 style="background:#0000FF; color:#FFD700;"|Non-Conference regular season

|-
|-
!colspan=9 style="background:#0000FF; color:#FFD700;"|Southland regular season

|-
!colspan=9 style="background:#0000FF; color:#FFD700;"| Southland tournament

See also
2015–16 McNeese State Cowgirls basketball team

References

McNeese Cowboys basketball seasons
McNeese State
McNeese State
McNeese State